The 2011 Guangzhou Evergrande season is the 58th year in Guangzhou Evergrande's existence and its 44th season in the Chinese football league, also its 22nd season in the top flight. The club was promoted from China League One at the end of the 2010 season.

Review
25 December 2010, Guangzhou confirmed that they had signed Zhang Linpeng, Jiang Ning, Feng Xiaoting and Yang Jun for a total fee of €3.4 million.
25 January 2011, China national team midfielder Yang Hao signed for Guangzhou from Beijing Guoan on a free transfer.
6 February 2011, Guangzhou got the second place in the 2011 Asian Challenge Cup after losing 5–3 in the penalty shootout with Tianjin Teda.
9 February 2011, Brazilian striker Cléo completed a €3.2 million move to Guangzhou from FK Partizan, signing a four-year-deal.
13 February 2011, Korean midfielder Cho Won-Hee joined Guangzhou Evergrande from Premier League side Wigan Athletic on a free transfer, which made him the second Korean player to play for Guangzhou F.C. after Park Ji-Ho.
2 March 2011, Guangzhou confirmed that they had signed Paulão on a four-year deal from Grêmio Prudente with a fee of €2.5 million.
8 March 2011, Guangzhou confirmed that they had signed Renato Cajá on a four-year deal from Botafogo with a fee of €1.6 million.
2 April 2011, Guangzhou's Super League 2011 campaign kicked off with a 1–0 home victory over Dalian Shide. Cléo scored the only goal of the match.
9 April 2011, Guangzhou broke club's record for longest unbeaten streak in the league (23 games, 17 wins and 6 draws) with a 1–1 away draw against Nanchang Hengyuan.
4 May 2011, Guangzhou's FA Cup 2011 campaign kicked off with a 3–2 home victory with second-tier club Guizhou Zhicheng. Muriqui scored a hat trick in the match.
8 May 2011, Guangzhou claimed first place in China Super League for the first time of the club's history after a 1–0 away win against Shenzhen Ruby.
12 May 2011, Guangzhou was kicked out in the FA Cup after losing at a 13 round super long Penalty shootout against Shaanxi Renhe.	
3 July 2011, Guangzhou confirmed that they had signed Darío Conca from Fluminense on a three-and-a-half-year-deal for a reported record breaking fee of €10 million.
18 September 2011, Guangzhou lost to Changchun Yatai 1–2 at Development Area Stadium, which ended club's record 44-league-match unbeaten run.
28 September 2011, Guangzhou successfully achieved their first Super League title away to Shaanxi Renhe, after a 4–1 win.

Squad

Technical staff

Transfers

Winter

In:

Out:

Summer

In:

Out:

Starting XI

Source: Squad stats.
Using the most used start formation 4–2–3–1.
Ordered by position on pitch (from back right to front left).

Pre-season and friendlies

Training matches

2011 Asian Challenge Cup

Real Madrid China tour

2011 CSL All-Stars Game

Competitions

Chinese Super League

League table

Results summary

Results by round

Matches

Chinese FA Cup

Squad statistics
Updated to games played on 2 November 2011.No appearances player not listed.

Notes and references

Guangzhou F.C.
Guangzhou F.C. seasons